The 1949 Dutch motorcycle Grand Prix was the third race of the 1949 Motorcycle Grand Prix season. It took place on the weekend of 9 July 1949 at the Assen circuit.

Italian rider Nello Pagani won the 500 cc race riding a Gilera from Leslie Graham and Arciso Artesiani. Pagani also won the 125 cc race on his smaller Gilera which saw him wrap up the first 125 cc World Championship having won the first two 125 cc races with only one race remaining.

Similarly, in winning the 350 cc race British Velocette rider Freddie Frith, having achieved a perfect score of 33 points from the first three races became the first 350 cc Motorcycle World Champion.

500 cc classification

350 cc classification

125 cc classification

References
 Büla, Maurice & Schertenleib, Jean-Claude (2001). Continental Circus 1949–2000. Chronosports S.A. 
 "Dutch Grand Prix", The Motor Cycle, 14 July 1949, pp. 36–38.
 

Dutch TT
Dutch
Tourist Trophy